Sayed Asim Hassan (born 19 November 1986 in Malerkotla, Punjab) is an Indian football player who plays as a midfielder.

Career

Mahilpur FA
He joined the Mahilpur Football Academy in the Under-19 batch and honed his game there for around three years. Mahilpur is another little known football crazy outpost, a city which is crazy about the game. It has produced stalwarts of Indian football.

JCT FC
The next logical step for any budding footballer in Punjab was the JCT Academy and it was no different for the midfielder. He graduated out of the Academy a couple of years later and joined the JCT senior team for 2007–08 I-League. His one year at JCT was not completely satisfactory mainly due to the lack of game time he got.

Pune
In the 2008 season, Asim joined Pune FC where it can be said that his pro career really began. Hassan is a recessed midfielder at Pune FC but he can see the larger picture which makes him, in some respects, a playmaker. He has an appetite for taking the game in to opposing off where his shooting skills can make him dangerous. His biggest moment in the game came during a crucial Pune FC match against SESA F.A. in a 2009 I-League 2nd Division encounter back in 2008-09. While it was not a tough match, in terms of strength of opposition, but Pune FC needed a win which they got. Asim missed most of the previous season with an injury. He has high hopes of the upcoming season and is looking to make a fresh start.

Personal life
Apart from the game, Hassan favours Punjabi pop artistes, Jazzy B and Babbu Mann. He also surfs the net.

Notes

Indian footballers
1978 births
Living people
People from Sangrur district
Footballers from Punjab, India
I-League players
I-League 2nd Division players
Pune FC players
ONGC FC players
Vasco SC players
Association football midfielders